

Life and Career 
Angela Giussani, the daughter of a Milanese entrepreneur, was born in Milan on the 10th of June 1922.
She is pushed into the school career by her family and, above all, by her father, who would like her to be a teacher.
When the war breaks out, she leaves Milan and moves to Cervia, located in the northern Italian region of Emilia – Romagna. There she meets Gino Sansoni, who would later become her husband.
When the War ends, she goes back to Milan, where she meets Sansoni again, now owner of an advertising agency but soon publisher of the publishing house "Astoria Edizioni”.
The two get married in 1946 and Angela, initially a model for the advertising campaigns published by Astoria, is then hired by the publishing house where she starts working on a series of children's books.
Her strength and resourcefulness push her further: she wants to become independent from her husband and realize her own projects, so, after quitting Astoria, she first takes her pilot's license and then founds her own publishing house.
Driven by the lack of entertainment literature for "grown-ups", Angela founds “Astorina”, and devotes herself to drawing, developing her first comic book, Big Ben Bolt, which, however, fails after only two years.
The marriage also comes to an end and, after the divorce, Angela returns to her mother's house, where she starts working with her sister Luciana, 6 years younger than her, with whom she will create Diabolik, the comic book that will make them famous.
Angela works all her life on Diabolik and directs Astorina until her death, which happens on February 10, 1987, in Milan.
After her passing, Luciana takes over the reins of the publishing house, signing the pages of Diabolik until the day of her death, March 31, 2001.

Diabolik: its origins 
Diabolik leads to the birth of the genre of Italian black comics, with the first issue published in 1962. However, this is not the first attempt by Angela Giussani who, as soon as “Astorina” was founded, tried to break through with Big Ben Bolt, but without success.
Hence, the lack of leisure literature for "grown-ups" is the pain – point that mainly drives this project, but in designing her idea, Angela addresses an even more specific problem. Indeed, she wants to give commuters the chance to pass the time on the train on their way to work with a simple, fast and inexpensive read. Moreover, 
as the book/magazine must fit in their pockets, Diabolik is published in the newsstands in pocket – sized booklets (11.5x16.9 cm).
The train is also protagonist of the Angela's moment of "epiphany", as the idea was born on the train while reading a Fantômas novel. Indeed, Uncle Claudio, a lover of comic books and, above all, of Lupin and Fantômas, he has always shared his passion with his granddaughters Angela and Luciana.
Therefore, in 1962, Diabolik “The King of Terror" was born, and Angela herself wrote the plot. 
The name is not accidental either but is closely related to a chronic fact of some years before. On February 25, 1958, in Turin, a Fiat worker, Mario Gilberti, was found wrapped in a sheet bleeding to death. Although the murder weapon never appeared, several letters written in cryptic language were found at the scene of the crime, all signed "Diabolich", from which the name of the comic is derived.
However, the Giussani's have never confirmed to be inspired by this fact, but they have never even denied it, perhaps to create more mystery around their character.

Diabolik: Who is he? 
Diabolik is an ingenious and masked thief protagonist of thefts of large sums of money and precious jewels. Despite being a criminal, Diabolik has his own ethics: just as Robin Hood “steals from the rich and gives to the poor”, Diabolik protects the weakest to the detriment of mobsters and criminals. 
At his side is Eva Kant, his life and adventures companion, who appears for the first time in the third episode, "The Diabolik’s arrest" (1963), and then becomes the protagonist of several issues.

A story of success: from 1962 to today 
Diabolik's success is remarkable, since 1962 it has been published without interruption and nowadays the more than 900 issues have been published. 
Furthermore, the thief does not exist only in the comics but also appears three times on the big screen: firstly in the film "Danger: Diabolik" of 1968 (by Mario Bava), then in the documentary "Diabolik is me" of 2019 (directed by Giancarlo Soldinel) and finally in the feature film of 2021 (by the Manetti brothers).
The kind thief is then at the center of the TV series "Diabolik" of 2000, of numerous commercials, of the radio comic of RaiRadio2 and of some videogames.
The success then reaches a global scale with the diffusion of numerous editions translated in many European, American and African countries

References

 Moraschini, S. (2021, December 13). Diabolik, breve biografia e storia del mito creato dalle Sorelle Giussani. Biografieonline. Retrieved April 18, 2022, from https://biografieonline.it/biografia-diabolik
 Redazione. (2017, February 10). Angela Giussani, 30 Anni Fa l'addio alla "mamma" di diabolik. iO Donna. Retrieved April 18, 2022, from https://www.iodonna.it/personaggi/interviste-gallery/2017/02/10/angela-giussani-30-anni-fa-laddio-alla-mamma-di-diabolik/
 Moraschini, S. (2019, May 23). Angela Giussani. La Biografia. Biografieonline. Retrieved April 18, 2022, from https://biografieonline.it/biografia-angela-giussani
 Cravero, F. (n.d.). La Vera Storia di Diabolik - la repubblica.it. Archivio - la Repubblica.it. Retrieved April 19, 2022, from https://ricerca.repubblica.it/repubblica/archivio/repubblica/2008/02/05/la-vera-storia-di-diabolik.html

Writers from Milan
Female comics writers
Sibling duos
20th-century Italian women writers
Italian comics writers
Comic book publishers (people)
Italian publishers (people)
Businesspeople from Milan